Acacia pteraneura is a shrub belonging to the genus Acacia and the subgenus Juliflorae that is endemic to arid areas of central Australia.

Description
The hoary red-brown to dark grey branchlets have resinous or non-resinous ribs at the extremities. Like most species of Acacia it has phyllodes rather than true leaves. The evergreen phyllodes have a green to grey-green colour are sometimes curved to sinuous or have a sigmoid shape with a length of  that appear in clusters of two to five on juvenile plants.

Distribution
It is native to the Pilbara, Mid West and Goldfields regions of Western Australia. where the bulk of the population is found from around Gascoyne Junction in the west to around Yalgoo and then extending east into the Northern Territory and South Australia where it is found in many different types of habitats but usually situated on stony plains growing in sandy loam, clay or sandy soils commonly over hardpan as a part of mixed open Mulga shrubland or woodland communities.

See also
List of Acacia species

References

pteraneura
Acacias of Western Australia
Plants described in 2012
Taxa named by Bruce Maslin